Chipshop is a hamlet in the civil parish of Lamerton in the West Devon district of Devon, England. The hamlet is situated on the B3362 and consists of approximately a dozen residences and a public house, the "Copper Penny Inn" (formerly the "Chipshop Inn"). The name of the hamlet is nothing to do with fish and chip shops – miners in the local copper and arsenic mines were paid by scrip in the form of "chips" which they could exchange for goods at locations such as inns. The inn gained the name, and the hamlet grew up around it and took its name.

References

Hamlets in Devon